Senegalia senegal (also known as Acacia senegal) is a small thorny deciduous tree from the genus Senegalia, which is known by several common names, including gum acacia, gum arabic tree, Sudan gum and Sudan gum arabic. In parts of India, it is known as Kher or Khor. It is native to semi-desert regions of Sub-Saharan Africa, as well as Oman, Pakistan, and west coastal India. It grows to a height of 5–12 metres (16-40'), with a trunk up to 30 cm (1') in diameter. Sudan is the source of the world's highest quality gum arabic, known locally as hashab gum in contrast to the related, but inferior, gum arabic from Red acacia or talah gum.

Uses

Gum arabic 

The tree is of great economic importance for the gum arabic it produces which is used as a food additive, in crafts, and as a cosmetic. The gum is drained from cuts in the bark, and an individual tree will yield 200 to 300 grams (7 to 10 oz). Eighty percent of the world's gum arabic is produced in Sudan.
The Chauhatan area of Barmer district in Rajasthan is also famous for gum production, this is called कुम्मट (Kummat) in local language there.

Forage 
New foliage is very useful as forage. Leaves and pods of S. senegal are browsed by domestic and wild ruminants.

Agriculture 
Like other legume species, S. senegal fixes nitrogen within Rhizobia or nitrogen-fixing bacteria living in root nodules. This nitrogen fixation enriches the poor soils where it is grown, allowing for the rotation of other crops in naturally nutrient-poor regions.

Traditional uses 
It has been reportedly used for its astringent properties, to treat bleeding, bronchitis, cough, diarrhea, dysentery, catarrh, gonorrhea, leprosy, typhoid fever and upper respiratory tract infections.

Rope 
Roots near the surface of the ground are quite useful in making all kinds of very strong ropes and cords.  The tree bark is also used to make rope.

Wood 
The wood of S. senegal can be used to make handles for tools, and parts for weaving looms. It is also valued as firewood and can be used to produce charcoal.

Chemistry 
S. senegal contains hentriacontane, a solid, long-chain alkane hydrocarbon. The leaf also contains the psychoactive alkaloid dimethyltryptamine.

See also 
 List of Acacia species known to contain psychoactive alkaloids
 List of psychoactive plants

References

External links 

 Senegalia senegal Photos (Google Images)

PROTA on Pl@ntUse

senegal
Flora of Asia
Flora of Uganda
Trees of Africa
Plants used in traditional African medicine